Gigantoproductus is a genus of extinct brachiopods in the order Productida and the family Monticuliferidae. The species were the largest of the carboniferous brachiopods, with the largest known species reaching  in shell width. Such huge invertebrates appeared in the Mississippian as the proportion of oxygen in the atmosphere began to rise. The earliest members of the Productida date back to the Silurian period, and Gigantoproductus is known to have existed between 339.4 to 318.1 million years ago, during the Carboniferous period. As fossils, their shells occur within a limestone matrix.

See also
List of brachiopod genera

References

External links
Image of Gigantoproductus fossil, geology collection, Kelvingrove Art Gallery and Museum
Gigantoproductus crassus Sarytcheva

Prehistoric brachiopod genera
Productida
Paleozoic life of Alberta